Royal Cambodian Armed Forces FA, also referred to as Tiffy Army for sponsorship reasons, is a Cambodian professional football club based in Phnom Penh. The club represents Ministry of National Defense and competes in the Cambodian Premier League, the highest level of football competition in the kingdom.

Originally founded in 1982 as Ministry of Defense, the team changed its name to Royal Cambodian Armed Forces Football Club after the restoration of monarchy in 1993 and renamed again in 2008 to Ministry of National Defense FC. In 2020 it was announced that the club would return to the name of  Royal Cambodian Armed Forces Football Club FA (RCAF FA) and would take on the nickname Tiffy Army due to sponsorship reasons.

Stadium
 

Tiffy Army's home ground is the RCAF Old Stadium, which has the capacity of 14,750 spectators.

Players

Honours

National
 Cambodian Premier League
Runner up : 2008 
Runner-up : 2016 
Runner-up : 2017

 Hun Sen Cup
Champion : 2010, 2016, 2018
Runner-up : 2013

 Cambodian Super Cup 
 Runner-up : 2017

International
 ASEAN Army Championship
4th : 2004
Group Qualified : 1999

 Asia Clubs Pre Season Championship
Champions : 2017

 Kun Min, China Pre Season Championship
Champions : 2018

References

External links
 Soccerway
 

Football clubs in Cambodia
Military association football clubs